John Steven Leake  (26 October 1949 – 13 February 2000) was an English recipient of the Distinguished Service Medal whilst working for the Navy, Army and Air Force Institutes (NAAFI), one of only twelve to be issued to the British forces during the Falklands War. Prior to working for the NAAFI, he worked in private security and was a soldier in the Devonshire and Dorset Regiment of the British Army.

Early life
Born in Erdington, a suburb of Birmingham, England, Leake attended Albert Road School in Aston. Leake joined the Devonshire and Dorset Regiment, serving with the 1st Battalion of the Regiment in Northern Ireland. As one of his roles, he was an instructor in the use of the General-purpose machine gun. 

At the age of 24, he left the British Army to work for private security companies, including for Securicor at Birmingham Airport. He was working for locally based IMI plc, when he decided to join the West Midlands Police, but after arriving early for his interview he read a local paper and saw an advertisement for the Navy, Army and Air Force Institutes (NAAFI), and decided to apply for a job with them instead.

NAAFI career

By the time the Falklands War broke out in 1982, Leake was serving as a Canteen Manager in the Naval Canteen Service wing of the NAAFI on board HMS Ardent, a Royal Navy Type 21 frigate.

The ship was ordered to proceed to Ascension Island, where after three days it proceeded to the Falklands. On the morning of 7 May, he was invited to practice on a general-purpose machine gun, being informed afterwards that he was to take up that role instead at action stations should active service be declared, with his former role of casualty coordinator in sickbay being taken by his Canteen Assistant, Nigel Woods. While en route, active service was declared and Leake signed on to the Royal Navy on a temporary basis, becoming a petty officer in the Royal Navy, but continuing in his previous role as Canteen Manager.

On 21 May, the Ardent moved into position in Falkland Sound as the lead ship to bombard Argentine positions in order to divert the attention of the enemy force from the British landing in the San Carlo inlet. Leake operated a deck mounted machine gun during the ensuing attacks by Argentine aircraft, and was credited with downing an Argentine Douglas A-4 Skyhawk, puncturing the plane's fuel tanks. He continued to man the gun whilst the ship was hit by seventeen missiles and bombs. Along with the remaining crew, Leake abandoned ship, boarding HMS Yarmouth, which pulled alongside the listing Ardent.

Leake was later posted to HMS Sutherland, and died on 13 February 2000 in St Luke's Hospice, Plymouth, from cancer after previously having a kidney removed in an attempt to beat the disease. His funeral took place at the crematorium at Weston Mill, Plymouth on 21 February 2000.

Private life
Leake married Carole, and together they had a son as well as two sons from Carole's previous marriage. At the time of Leake's death, he was living in Milehouse, Plymouth. 
He was one of five brothers, the others being David, Ian, Geoffrey, and Stephen.

Legacy
Admiral Sandy Woodward, the commander of the British Naval Force during the Falklands War, wrote about Leake in his memoirs. He said "I was sure there would be many stories of heroism to come out of it, but of them all, I remain most impressed by the conduct of John Leake who manned the machine gun in Ardent. He was not really in the Navy, but, as we say, we are all of one company, the Captain and the NAAFI man. And we all go together."

Following Leake's death in 2000, his medals were put up for auction on 23 September 2011. They sold for £110,000, beating the previous record paid for a Distinguished Service Medal set at £59,800 in 2003.

See also
Tommy Brown

References

1949 births
2000 deaths
Royal Navy personnel of the Falklands War
Recipients of the Distinguished Service Medal (United Kingdom)
Navy, Army and Air Force Institutes personnel
Royal Navy sailors
Deaths from cancer in England
Devonshire and Dorset Regiment soldiers
Military personnel from Birmingham, West Midlands